was a Japanese daimyō of the early Edo period. The lord of Fukōzu han in Mikawa Province, he was a personal aide to Tokugawa Ieyasu. Son of the Kyoto Shoshidai Itakura Katsushige, and younger brother of Itakura Shigemune (successor to Katsushige as Shoshidai).

Born in Mikawa, he was styled Naizen no Kami (内膳正), and together with Matsudaira Masatsuna and Akimoto Yasutomo, he served as Tokugawa Ieyasu's personal aide (kinju shuttōnin 近習出頭人). In the Osaka Winter Campaign, he acted as negotiator with the Toyotomi.

In the 11th month of Kan'ei 14 (1637), he was appointed chief commander of the expeditionary force that was sent to put down the Shimabara Rebellion. Shigemasa failed to take Hara Castle, the rebels' headquarters, despite his use of ninja, tunnelling methods, and catapults. As a result, the shōgun Iemitsu grew impatient with him, and sent Matsudaira Nobutsuna as his replacement. In an effort to regain his credibility, Shigemasa led a sudden assault on the castle, but in the process, was shot dead by an arrow.

Shigemasa's death poem was:

Aratama no/toshi no hajime ni/saku hana no/na nominokoraba/saki ga ketoshire

Translated,

In a hail of bullets/at the start of the year/only the name/of blooming flowers/remains for the future

References

Miura Baien. Samidare-Sho. Trans. Leon Hurvitz. Appearing in Monumenta Nipponica, Vol. 8, No. 1/2 (1952), pp. 289–326.

External links
Family tree and background of Shigemasa's branch of the Itakura
Background information on the Shimabara Rebellion

Samurai
1588 births
1638 deaths
History of Christianity in Japan
Itakura clan
Daimyo